Monroe Community College is a public community college in Monroe County, New York. It is part of the State University of New York. The college has two campuses; the main campus in the town of Brighton, and the Downtown Campus in the City of Rochester. The college also has off-site learning at the Applied Technologies Center, Monroe County Public Safety Training Facility and online.

History 
The origins of what became known as Monroe Community College begin in 1960, when a well-known local physician, Dr. Samuel J. Stabins (1901–1989) recognized the need to prepare students to work in hospitals and health care facilities. In 1961, MCC became part of the SUNY system, and its program offerings were expanded to prepare graduates for employment, or transfer to a four-year institution. Initially, the college was lodged in East High School located at 410 Alexander Street. The location was condemned by the city as a fire hazard, which forced the school to make renovations. On September 9, 1962, the original campus re-opened with the first class of 720 students.

Three years later in June 1965, MCC became the first college in the nation to receive accreditation within three years of its founding. Due to increasing enrollment, the college overflowed its first location's capacity. In 1968, the college moved to its present main campus on East Henrietta Road in Brighton. In 1991, the college announced plans for a second campus to serve a steady influx of students. The Damon City Campus, named in honor of longtime Trustee E. Kent Damon, opened its doors the following year in downtown Rochester, and educates students in law, criminal justice, human services and K-12 teaching.

, MCC has served more than a quarter of a million people. Within the past several years MCC has welcomed the additions of the Louis S. and Molly B. Wolk Center for Excellence in Nursing, and the PAC fitness and recreational facility.

Presidents

Campuses
MCC occupies two campuses:  the  main campus on 1000 East Henrietta Road in the Town of Brighton, New York and the Downtown Campus on 321 State Street near Frontier Field and Kodak Tower.  MCC also offers classes at the Applied Technologies Center on West Henrietta Road which includes automotive technologies, heating/cooling ventilation, and precision tooling and machinery. In addition, they train law enforcement,  fire safety, and emergency medical services personnel at the county Public Safety Training Facility.

Academics

Today, Monroe Community College hosts a diverse student body and offers 100+ degree and certification programs.

Of the approximately 25,000+ students who take classes through Monroe Community College annually, more than 65 percent are under 25 years old, and more than half are women. The majority of students are enrolled in certificate and degree programs. In addition, the college trains the area's workforce through open enrollment and corporate training programs, serving small to mid-size employers.

Many students opt to take a "2+2" transfer program, in which they enroll in a program to earn their associate degree in two years with the intent of transferring to a college or university — such as the University of Rochester, Rochester Institute of Technology, Saint John Fisher College, Roberts Wesleyan College, SUNY Geneseo, SUNY Brockport, Nazareth College, or the Eastman School of Music — to complete a bachelor's degree.

MCC lives its vision as a champion of equity, opportunity, innovation, and excellence while transforming students' lives and local communities.

Student life

Students maintain a regular newspaper, The Monroe Doctrine, which includes both a bi-weekly print version and an online version. The radio station (closed circuit/web feed only) is also student operated. More than 60 student clubs and organizations enhance the college experience for MCC students through leadership and learning opportunities outside the classroom.

The Student Association, of which all currently enrolled students are members, is governed by the Brighton Campus Student Government Association (SGA) and the Downtown Campus Student Events and Governance Association (SEGA).

The Campus Activities Board (CAB) is the events organization at MCC. The CAB sponsors on-campus activities such as Freestyle Fridays, Fall Fest and Spring Fling. CAB also brings in Guest Speakers to present on various current issues of interest to students.

Phi Theta Kappa, the international honor society of two-year colleges and academic programs, has a chapter on the MCC campus.  The chapter also participates in the Honors in Action Study Topic and the College Project to remain a 5-star chapter.

MCC offers smart classrooms, interactive videoconferencing capabilities, eight electronic learning centers (the largest of which has 100+ workstations), the Warshof Conference Center (open to the public), dental clinic, fitness and dance studios, a synthetic turf field, and a variety of dining and restaurant options. The Brighton Campus, along with the Applied Technologies Center on West Henrietta Road and the Downtown Campus is completely wireless. A . athletics facility – the PAC Center – is also located on the Brighton Campus.

MCC provides residence halls for on-campus living. The Alice Holloway Young Residence Halls opened on the Brighton Campus in 2003. There are four residence halls: Alexander Hall, Canal Hall, Pioneer Hall, and Tribune Hall.

Athletics

The Monroe Community College athletics program, commonly known as the MCC Tribunes, competes in the National Junior College Athletic Association (NJCAA) in Region 3. MCC's athletics program began in 1962 with a men's basketball team coached by George C. Monagan, the school's athletic director from 1962 to 1988. Teams in men's soccer and baseball were added the following year.  the Tribunes' website lists 12 active programs (5 men's teams, 6 women's teams, and a co-ed esports team).

The school's athletic facilities include an indoor recreational center with a turf field and running track, an aquatic center, a basketball court, and outdoor fields for baseball, softball, and soccer/lacrosse. John L. DiMarco Field, a 1,500-seat outdoor venue used by MCC's soccer and lacrosse teams, also served as the home of professional soccer team Rochester New York FC in 2022. The team folded afterwards.

Title IX 
On April 27, 2016, the U.S. Department of Education opened a federal Investigation to investigate if MCC had violated Title IX.

Notable people

Alumni

Kelly Brannigan, model (Deal or No Deal)
Robert Duffy (1988), Mayor of the City of Rochester, Lieutenant Governor of New York
 Kimika Forbes, association football goalkeeper for Trinidad and Tobago women's national football team
Lou Gramm (1971), original lead singer of Foreigner
Travis McCoy, lead singer of Gym Class Heroes
Tim Redding, former Major League Baseball pitcher
Dave Sarachan, assistant coach, LA Galaxy; former head coach, Chicago Fire, and U.S. soccer player
Jeff Sluman (1976), professional golfer
Cathy Turner (1984), Olympic gold medalist

Faculty
Otis Young, first black actor to star in a television western, "The Outcasts"; former assistant professor of Communications and head of the Drama Department at MCC from 1989 to 1999. A vital part of MCC's history, Professor Young died in 2001.

References

External links
Official website

 
Education in Rochester, New York
Educational institutions established in 1964
SUNY community colleges
Two-year colleges in the United States
Universities and colleges in Monroe County, New York
1964 establishments in New York (state)
NJCAA athletics